Ərmənət (also, Armenat and Ermenet) is a village and municipality in the Oghuz Rayon of Azerbaijan.  It has a population of 707.

References 

Populated places in Oghuz District